Regulator may refer to:

Technology
 Regulator (automatic control), a device that maintains a designated characteristic, as in:
 Battery regulator
 Pressure regulator
 Diving regulator
 Voltage regulator
 Regulator (sewer), a control device used in a combined sewer system
 Regulator, a device in mechanical watches attached to the balance spring for adjusting the rate of the balance wheel 
 Regulator precision pendulum clock, originally used as a time-standard for adjusting or regulating other clocks and watches
 Regulator, the throttle of a steam engine
 Regulator, a component of Uilleann pipes, a form of bagpipes

Science
 Regulator (mathematics), a positive real number used in Dirichlet's unit theorem
 Regulator (biology), an animal that is able to maintain a constant internal environment
 Regulator gene, a gene involved in controlling the expression of one or more other genes
 Regulator, an auxiliary physics concept used in regularization

Music and literature
 The Regulators (novel), a novel by Stephen King writing as Richard Bachman
 "The Regulator", a song by Clutch from Blast Tyrant
 "Regulator", a song by Devin Townsend from Ocean Machine: Biomech

Organizations
 Regulator, a member of the Royal Navy Police, formerly the Royal Navy Regulating Branch
 Regulator, a member of the Red Army traffic control units, mostly female
 Regulators, a faction in the Regulator Movement (1765–1771) in Provincial North Carolina
 Regulator, a member of the Shaysites, followers of Daniel Shays during Shays' Rebellion (1786)
 Regulators, a faction in the Regulator–Moderator War (1839–1844)
 Regulator, a vigilante organized in response to the Banditti of the Prairie (1835–1848)
 Lincoln County Regulators, a deputized posse during the Lincoln County War (1878)
 Regulatory agency, a governmental body which oversees a particular economic activity

Other uses
 Regulator, a flood control structure designed to manage the return of flood water from flood plains and diversion areas to the main channel
 Regulator (sternwheeler), a sternwheel-driven steamboat built in 1891

See also
 
 
 Regulate (disambiguation)
 Regulation (disambiguation)